The Longford Circuit was a temporary motor racing course laid out on public roads at Longford,  south-west of Launceston in Tasmania, Australia. It was located on the northern edges of the town and its  lap passed under a railway line viaduct, crossed the South Esk River via the wooden Kings Bridge, turned hard right at the doorstep of the Longford Hotel, passed over the railway line using a level crossing and traversed the South Esk again via another wooden structure, the Long Bridge.

The circuit was in use from 1953 to 1968.

History
Its first race meeting was held in 1953, the Australian Grand Prix was staged there in 1959 and 1965 and the track hosted a round of the Tasman Series each year from 1964 to 1968. Its use as a motor racing venue was curtailed due to financial issues, following the running of the 1968 Tasman Series meeting.

Drivers
Drivers who raced at Longford read as a "who's who" of 1960s Grand Prix racing. The list includes World Champions Jack Brabham, Jim Clark, Graham Hill, Phil Hill, Denny Hulme and Jackie Stewart, as well as Bruce McLaren and Chris Amon. Australian open wheel and touring car stars Bib Stillwell, Lex Davison, Leo Geoghegan, Frank Matich, Frank Gardner, Spencer Martin, Kevin Bartlett, John Harvey, Ian Geoghegan, Norm Beechey, Bob Jane and Allan Moffat also raced at the circuit. Tasmanian John Youl was among the leading drivers in Australia during the 1960 period.

Lap Record
Longford would continue as Australia's fastest road racing circuit until the Formula One series moved to the new Albert Park Grand Prix Circuit in Melbourne in 1996. The official fastest race lap records at the Longford Circuit are listed as:

Present day
 There is little left of the original track as the two bridges have long been demolished and a highway now intersects the network of roads on which the circuit was laid out.

Motorsport returned to Longford in 2011 with the first running of the Longford Revival Festival which takes place on Pateena Road (The Flying Mile). There drivers get to run their cars, both road cars and historic race cars, down The Flying Mile.

References

External links
Longford Venue (Tasman-Series.com via Archive.org)
Australian Touring Car Championship 1962 - with map of the circuit (primotipo.com)

Former Supercars Championship circuits
Sports venues in Tasmania
Defunct motorsport venues in Australia
Australian Grand Prix
Motorsport in Tasmania
Motorsport venues in Tasmania